Navgilem (Russian and Tajik: Навгилем) is a village and jamoat in northern Tajikistan. It is part of the city of Isfara in Sughd Region. The jamoat has a total population of 38,104 (2015). It consists of 5 villages, including Navgilem (the seat) and Oftobruy.

References

Populated places in Sughd Region
Jamoats of Tajikistan